Pier Francesco Foschi (1502–1567) was an Italian painter active in Florence in a Mannerist style. He was pupil of Andrea del Sarto and assisted Pontormo with his frescoes at Careggi in 1536. He completed 3 altarpieces, commissioned in 1540–1545 for the church of Santo Spirito in Florence: an Immaculate Conception, Resurrection, and a Transfiguration. Foschi was also influenced by Il Bronzino. One of his pupils was Alessandro Fei.

Also called Pier Francesco di Jacopo Foschi or Toschi. He was the son of Jacopo Sandro Foschi, known for his Madonna and Child with the Infant Saint John. (Utah Museum of Fine Arts).

Foschi is best noted for his portraits painted between 1530 and 1540, including his Portrait of a Lady (Museo Thyssen-Bornemisza), Portrait of a Young Man Weaving a Wreath of Flowers (Utah Museum of Fine Arts), and his Portrait of a Man, (Uffizi Gallery).

In his portraits he adhered to Mannerist style, utilizing a slight Contrapposto in the sitter with their head turned from the body. This pose gave the depiction a spontaneity and sense of movement for the innovative Mannerists, but was eventually so formulaic that it lost its intention of originality. Foschi’ Portrait of a Lady and Portrait of a Man Weaving a Wreath of Flowers, shows an interesting use of background and subtle symbolisms to convey the essence of the sitter, while his Portrait of a Man (at the Uffizi), shows a more standard portrait depiction of the period.

Gallery

References

External links

Links to images and information about Foschi at www.artcyclopedia.com

1502 births
1567 deaths
People from the Province of Florence
16th-century Italian painters
Italian male painters
Painters from Tuscany
Mannerist painters